Euxanthone is a naturally occurring xanthonoid, an organic compound with the molecular formula C13H8O4. It can be synthesized from gentisic acid, β-resorcylic acid, and acetic anhydride. It occurs naturally in many plant species. Commercial production is from purified root extract of Polygala tenuifolia. It has been investigated for bioactive properties.

References

Xanthones